The flag of Plymouth is the flag of the port city and unitary authority of Plymouth in Devon, United Kingdom. It consists of a white shield, containing a green diagonal cross separating four black towers, on a field of red.

Symbolism

Towers
The four towers of the flag represent the four forts surrounding and defending the city dating back to the English Civil War era, and are visible on the city council's coat of arms.

The city's motto,  translates as the 'strongest tower is the name of Jehovah', and this refers to the city's successful resistance to the Royalist siege during that conflict.

Colours
The green, black and white colours of the shield appear to be traditional in the city, and the wider county of Devon, as they are used as part of several school uniforms in the city, the colours of Plymouth Argyle Football Club, and as the colours of the Flag of Devon.

Plymouth, Devon
Plymouth